Mohamed Radwan (born 25 March 1958) is an Egyptian football manager and former player who played as a midfielder.

References

1958 births
Living people
Egyptian footballers
Al Mokawloon Al Arab SC players
Association football midfielders
Egypt international footballers
1984 African Cup of Nations players
Egyptian football managers
Al Mokawloon Al Arab SC managers
Ghazl El Mahalla SC managers
Egyptian Premier League managers